Fernkloof Nature Reserve is a nature reserve in the Kleinrivier Mountains above Hermanus, Western Cape Province, South Africa.
The reserve harbours over 1300 species of plant.

Here is a complete list, many with photos, of all plant species found in Fernkloof Nature Reserve.

The Fernkloof Nature Reserve comprises 0.002% of the area of the Cape Floral Kingdom but contains 14% of its plant species in just 18 square kilometres. More info here

Flora Gallery

Fauna Gallery

References

Fernkloof Nature Reserve website

External links

Protected areas of the Western Cape
Nature reserves in South Africa